See Zutik for the current Basque leftist party.

Zutik (Stand Up in Basque) was the internal organ of the Basque clandestine terrorist organization ETA. It was founded in 1961.

The current organ of ETA is named Zutabe (Pillar).

References

1961 establishments in Spain
Basque history
Basque-language magazines
Basque politics
Defunct magazines published in Spain
Defunct political magazines
Francoist Spain
Magazines established in 1961
Magazines with year of disestablishment missing